Natalka Karpa (14 August 1981), born Nataliya Semenivna Karpa is a Ukrainian singer, TV-host, and the "Distinguished Artist of Ukraine" (2009). She is closely associated with the city of Lviv.

Biography
Was born in the small city of Dobromyl in Ukraine, near the Polish border. She was born into a musical family; her grandmother once sang in a choir, while father was a professional musician. When Karpa was five her parents bought her a piano and later she enrolled in a music school.

She started to sing in a public choir "Pysanka" and later became a solo singer for the vocal-instrumental ensemble "Halytska perlyna" (Halych Perl) headed by Lesya Salistra.

Finished her school with a gold medal and has two higher education diplomas: Lviv Medical University (former medical campus of Lviv University) and the English Philology of Lviv Polytechnic. During her studies in universities Karpa was a solo singer for a medical jazz band "Medicus".

She participated in numerous Ukrainian festivals. Her first the most successful hit was a song "Kalyna – ne verba".

Along her singing career, Karpa also is an anchor lady for few TV-programs such as "Ekstremalnyi weekend" (NTA) and "Vidkryi sebe" (Television and Radio company "Lyuks"). Together with her producer Yaroslav Stepanyk she found her own producing center "KARPARATION" (until 2001 "Nika").

Natalka Karpa also founded a line of cosmetics and released her own perfumes.

Albums

Love will save the world – 2001

Forgive me – 2004

Christmas star – 2004

History – 2007
 2007 Moon Records Ukraine/Lavina Music

The Best of – 2013
 2013 Moon Records Ukraine

Ukrainian Christmas Carols – 2014
 2014 Moon Records Ukraine

See also
 https://itunes.apple.com/ua/artist/natalka-karpa/id679779088

References

External links
 http://www.karparation.com
 http://www.natalkakarpa.com
 http://www.facebook.com/natalkakarpa
 http://www.instagram.com/natalkakarpa
 https://www.twitter.com/natalkakarpa

1981 births
Living people
People from Lviv Oblast
21st-century Ukrainian women singers
Ukrainian pop singers
Recipients of the title of Merited Artist of Ukraine